The Crown of the Russian Empire, or Once Again the Elusive Avengers (translit. Korona Rossiyskoy Imperii, ili Snova Neulovimye) is a 1971 Soviet action movie, a second sequel of The Elusive Avengers, directed by Edmond Keosayan and made on Mosfilm.

Synopsis
The Elusive Avengers, a posse of young Red Partisans, including Valerka, a former schoolboy, Yashka, a devil-may-care gypsy, and two orphan siblings, Danka and his sister Ksanka, became Cheka agents after successfully stealing the map in The New Adventures of the Elusive Avengers. They wish to abandon their service and study in a university, but the young Soviet Republic needs them again. A group of White émigrés, influenced by a scheming French politician, Monsieur Duc, want to crown a new Tsar in Paris. Two obvious frauds compete for the Russian throne in exile, but they want to be crowned with the real Crown of the Russian emperors.

The White émigrés form a team that will infiltrate the Soviet Union and steal the crown from the museum. Old "friends" from the previous movies, Ataman Burnash, Stabs Captain Ovechkin, and Colonel Kudasov, prepare to enter the USSR along with the notorious thief Naryshkin, a "specialist" who will steal the crown. However, Kudasov tries to double-cross his accomplices and is wounded by a gunshot. Ovechkin becomes the team's leader.

The émigrés return to the USSR, but Naryshkin is accidentally arrested by police. The Cheka doesn't want them to flee, and Yashka, disguised as a pick-pocket, is put in Naryshkin's cell and arranges his escape. He gains Naryshkin's trust and enters the gang. They enter the museum at night, only to find the crown stolen by Ovechkin.

Ovechkin flees Moscow by train. Ksanka pursues him, but loses the trail when he hides in the catacombs of Odessa. He is waiting to be picked up by a ship and successfully escape with the crown. Danka and Valerka immediately go to Paris, where they learn that Monsieur Duc didn't want to use the crown for the coronation. Instead, Duc wanted to sell it for millions of dollars. After Kudasov reveals that, he is shot by his former aide, Lieutenant Perov, who now works for Monsieur Duc along with Ovechkin.

Duc's minions, led by Perov, hijack a ship to pick up Ovechkin and carry the crown to Cape Town. Unfortunately, Danka and Valerka are aboard. When the ship picks up Ovechkin and the crown, Yashka, Ksanka, and Naryshkin board it to thwart Perov's plan. Ovechkin, outnumbered and outgunned by the Chekists, tries to throw the crown to the sea, but Naryshkin steals it and hands to the Avengers.

Cast
 Viktor Kosykh - Danka Shchus
 Valentina Kurdyukova - Ksanka Shchus
 Vasiliy Vasilev - Yashka the Gypsy
 Michael Metyolkin - Valerka Meshcheryakov
 Ivan Pereverzev - Smirnov, department head of Cheka
 Yefim Kopelyan - chieftain Ignat Burnash
 Armen Dzhigarkhanyan - Former captain Petr S. Ovechkin
 Arkady Tolbuzin - Former colonel Leopold S. Kudasov
 Vladimir Ivashov - Former lieutenant Perov
 Vladislav Strzhelchik - "Prince" Naryshkin, a professional burglar
 Vladimir Belokurov - "shaggy" impostor to the role of the Emperor of Russia
 Rolan Bykov - "bald" impostor to the role of the Emperor of Russia
 Yan Frenkel -  Louis / Leonid, garzon, former violinist of the restaurant (voice by Artyom Karapetyan)
 Lyudmila Gurchenko - Agrafena Zavolzhskaya, chansonnier from the restaurant
 Andrei Fajt - Mr. Duke
 Grigory Shpigel as photographer
 Nina Agapova as american lady with parrot
 Yakov Lenz as old man who knew everything

External links

1971 films
Mosfilm films
1970s Russian-language films
1971 comedy films
Films directed by Edmond Keosayan
Russian sequel films
Ostern films
Soviet teen films